Jordan Skylar Bowers (born April 5, 2003) is an American artistic gymnast and was part of the United States women's national gymnastics team. She won the junior all-around gold medals at the 2018 Pacific Rim Championships and the 2018 Junior Pan American Championships.  She is currently competing for the Oklahoma Sooners in NCAA gymnastics.

Personal life 
Bowers was born to John and Tracy Bowers in 2003, and she has one sibling, a sister named Felicity. Bowers began gymnastics in 2005.

Gymnastics career

Junior

2016–17 
Bowers began competing at the junior elite level in 2016, where she competed at the American classic and the P&G National Championships.

2018
Bowers was officially added to the junior national team after she was named to the team to compete at the 2018 Pacific Rim Gymnastics Championships alongside seniors Grace McCallum, Morgan Hurd, and Jordan Chiles and fellow juniors Kayla DiCello and Sunisa Lee. There she won gold in the team, junior all-around, and junior floor exercise finals. She won bronze on uneven bars. Bowers later competed at the Pan American Championships alongside Leanne Wong, Tori Tatum, and JaFree Scott from June 13-15 in Buenos Aires, Argentina. There the team won gold in the team final and individually Bowers won gold in the all-around, on uneven bars, and on floor exercise.  Additionally she won bronze on the balance beam behind Zoé Allaire-Bourgie of Canada and compatriot Wong.

On July 28 Bowers competed at the 2018 U.S. Classic. She finished third in the all-around behind Wong and DiCello after falling twice on floor exercise. She finished second on balance beam and uneven bars. Bowers traveled to Boston to compete in the 2018 U.S. Championships in August. She was one of the favorite to win the title based on her earlier victories in the all-around, but she struggled on the first day with multiple errors and finished in 17th place in the all-around on the first day. Bowers withdrew from the second day of competition, citing an injury sustained during training that had also hampered her on the first day of competition. Because she did not finish in the top six all-around, she was not automatically named to the national team.

Senior

2019
In 2019 Bowers turned senior.  In February she attended the national team camp in hopes of making an international assignment.  Just before the camp Bowers re-injured her lower back and it was determined she had a spinal disc herniation and an edema on her vertebrae.  She sat out the remainder of the season in order to recover.

On November 2, Bowers announced on Instagram that she had retired from elite gymnastics and would continue training as a level 10 gymnast with the intention of competing at the University of Oklahoma, starting in the 2021–22 season.

Level 10

2020–21
On November 11, 2020 Bowers signed her National Letter of Intent with the Oklahoma Sooners.

Bowers competed at the 2021 Developmental Program National Championships where she placed third in the all-around in the Senior-E division.  Additionally she placed second on balance beam and uneven bars.

NCAA

2021–2022 season 
Bowers made her NCAA debut on January 9 in a meet against Alabama.  She competed the all-around, posting the highest score of the day on floor with a 9.925.  The following week in a meet against Utah she scored a 9.975 on vault, the highest of the meet.  Her all-around score of 39.550 was the second highest behind Grace McCallum.  As a result Bowers was named Big 12 Gymnast of the Week for the first time.

Career perfect 10.0

Competitive history

References

External links
 

2003 births
American female artistic gymnasts
Living people
Level 10 gymnasts
Sportspeople from Lincoln, Nebraska
U.S. women's national team gymnasts
Oklahoma Sooners women's gymnasts
NCAA gymnasts who have scored a perfect 10